Baron Compton is an abeyant title in the Peerage of England, meaning that inheritance of the title stopped because there was no legal priority as to which daughter would inherit the title. The title was created in 1572 for the Tudor politician, Sir Henry Compton. In 1618, his son was created Earl of Northampton. The titles remained united until the fifth earl died without any male heirs in 1754 and the title passed to his only daughter, Charlotte, who had already inherited the title of Baroness Ferrers of Chartley from her mother in 1740. Charlotte was the wife of Hon. George Townshend, who became Viscount Townshend in 1764 and was created Marquess Townshend after her death in 1770. The title then remained with the marquessate until her grandson, the third marquess, died childless in 1855 and both baronies became abeyant between his sisters and their descendants.

Barons Compton (1572)
Henry Compton, 1st Baron Compton (1544–1589)
William Compton, 1st Earl of Northampton, 2nd Baron Compton (d. 1630) 
Spencer Compton, 2nd Earl of Northampton, 3rd Baron Compton (1601–1643)
James Compton, 3rd Earl of Northampton, 4th Baron Compton (1622–1681)
George Compton, 4th Earl of Northampton, 5th Baron Compton (1664–1727)
James Compton, 5th Earl of Northampton, 6th Baron Compton (1687–1754)
Charlotte Townshend, 16th Baroness Ferrers of Chartley, 7th Baroness Compton (d. 1770)
George Townshend, 2nd Marquess Townshend, 8th Baron Compton (1753–1811)
George Townshend, 3rd Marquess Townshend, 9th Baron Compton (1778–1855)

References

1572 establishments in England
Baron
Abeyant baronies in the Peerage of England
Noble titles created in 1572